The Virginian is an American Western television series which ran from September 19, 1962 until March 24, 1971, with a total of 249 episodes across nine seasons. It aired on NBC in color and starred James Drury and Doug McClure. The Virginian was renamed The Men from Shiloh for its final season.

Series

Episodes

Season 1 (1962–63)

Season 2 (1963–64)

Season 3 (1964–65)

Season 4 (1965–66)

Season 5 (1966–67)

Season 6 (1967–68)

Season 7 (1968–69)

Season 8 (1969–70)

Season 9 (1970–71)
The ninth season aired as The Men From Shiloh.

References

External links
 

Virginian